Knock Three Times is a country album by Billy "Crash" Craddock. It was released on Cartwheel Records in 1971. It was re-released in 1973 on ABC Records. The album featured Craddock's first top ten hit, "Knock Three Times".

Track listing
"Knock Three Times" (Irwin Levine, L. Russell Brown) - 2:30
"Country Pride" (Dale Morris, J. Sahnger) - 2:58
"Hide and Seek" (Ethel Byrd, Paul Winley) - 2:11
"Confidence and Common Sense" (Durwood Haddock) - 2:45
"Home in Tennessee" (Conrad Pierce) - 2:10
"Mention My Name" (Ron Chancey) - 2:39
"Lonely Boy" (Paul Anka) - 2:26
"I Ran Out of Time" (Dale Morris) - 2:23
"Treat Her Right" (Roy Head) - 2:09
"The Best I Ever Had" (Dale Morris, Ron Chancey) - 2:50

Billy "Crash" Craddock albums
1971 albums
Albums produced by Ron Chancey
ABC Records albums
Cartwheel Records albums